The Temptations in Japan is a 1973 live album recorded by The Temptations in Japan, where it was exclusively issued. The album was later remastered and re-released on compact disc in 2004, where a limited edition 5000 copy run was made for sale in the US and other countries.

Background

This album was significant in that it brought out the maturation and growth of members Damon Harris and Richard Street as worthy replacements for original members Eddie Kendricks and Paul Williams. Highlights include a phenomenal arrangement of "The First Time Ever I Saw Your Face", "Masterpiece", "Love Woke Me Up This Morning", "Just My Imagination", "Hey Girl (I Like Your Style)" and "Papa Was a Rolling Stone", for years the only track to be available for release in the United States. The group harmonies and arrangements of band director Cornelius Grant are tight. One of the group's better live albums, along with 1967's The Temptations Live featuring the classic lineup, and 1970's Live at London's Talk of The Town, which featured Dennis Edwards and Eddie Kendricks in its lineup.

Track listing
"Plastic Man"
"I Can't Get Next to You"
"Love Woke Me Up This Morning"
"Medley: "Get Ready"/"My Girl"/"The Way You Do the Things You Do"
"The First Time Ever I Saw Your Face"
"Hey Girl (I Like Your Style)"
"Cloud Nine"
Introduction of Band and Group
"A Song for You"
"Masterpiece"
"Just My Imagination"
"Papa Was a Rolling Stone"

Personnel

 Dennis Edwards
 Richard Street
 Damon Harris
 Melvin Franklin
 Otis Williams

References 

1973 live albums
The Temptations live albums
Hip-O Records live albums